The 2001 First-Year Player Draft, Major League Baseball's annual amateur draft, was held on June 5 and 6.

First round selections

Supplemental First Round Selections

Compensation Picks

Background

On June 1, 2001, Rolando Viera, a Cuban baseball pitcher who had recently left Cuba, attempted to enjoin Major League Baseball from including him in the 2001 draft so that he could instead sign as a free agent. Viera, represented by attorney Alan Gura and agent Joe Kehoskie, claimed that the MLB draft was discriminatory because it had different signing rules for Cubans than for other foreign players. On June 4, federal judge James D. Whittemore ruled that whatever financial loss Viera suffered from being subject to the draft did not satisfy the federal injunction requirement of irreparable harm. Viera was picked by the Boston Red Sox that same week in the seventh round of the draft.

The Minnesota Twins selected St. Paul, MN native Joe Mauer with the number one pick in the 2001 draft. The 18-year-old Mauer, a catcher from Cretin-Derham Hall High School in St. Paul, became the seventh Minnesotan to be selected in the first round and the first to be chosen number one overall. The back-stop was a member of the USA Junior National Team and won a gold medal at the world tournament in Taiwan in 1999. He was also a High School football standout as a quarterback and signed a letter of intent to play football at Florida State University before being drafted.

Right-handed pitcher Mark Prior of the University of Southern California was selected by the Chicago Cubs with the second overall pick in the draft. Prior, who was previously selected in the supplemental first round of the 1998 draft by the Yankees, was the first college player chosen in the 2001 draft. Prior won numerous National Player of the Year awards after going 15-1 with a 1.69 ERA and 202 strikeouts to lead the Trojans to a College World Series berth in his junior year.

Other notable players 
Kelly Shoppach, 2nd round, 48th overall by the Boston Red Sox
J. J. Hardy, 2nd round, 56th overall by the Milwaukee Brewers
Brandon League, 2nd round, 59th overall by the Toronto Blue Jays
Dan Haren, 2nd round, 72nd overall by the St. Louis Cardinals
Ryan Theriot, 3rd round, 78th overall by the Chicago Cubs
Scott Hairston, 3rd round, 98th overall by the Arizona Diamondbacks
Ricky Nolasco, 4th round, 108th overall by the Chicago Cubs
Jeff Keppinger, 4th round, 114th overall by the Pittsburgh Pirates
Josh Barfield, 4th round, 120th overall by the San Diego Padres
Kyle Davies, 4th round, 135th overall by the Atlanta Braves
Brendan Harris, 5th round, 138th overall by the Chicago Cubs
Ryan Howard, 5th round, 140th overall by the Philadelphia Phillies
C.J. Wilson, 5th round, 141st overall by the Texas Rangers
Jim Johnson, 5th round, 143rd overall by the Baltimore Orioles
Ryan Raburn, 5th round, 147th overall by the Detroit Tigers
Skip Schumaker, 5th round, 164th overall by the St. Louis Cardinals
Edwin Jackson, 6th round, 190th overall by the Los Angeles Dodgers
Chad Tracy, 7th round, 218th overall by the Arizona Diamondbacks
Dan Johnson, 7th round, 221st overall by the Oakland Athletics
Kevin Youkilis, 8th round, 243rd overall by the Boston Red Sox
Luke Scott, 9th round, 277th overall by the Cleveland Indians
Michael Wood, 10th round, 311th overall by the Oakland Athletics
Geovany Soto, 11th round, 318th overall by the Chicago Cubs
Dan Uggla, 11th round, 338th overall by the Arizona Diamondbacks
Jason Bartlett, 13th round, 390th overall by the San Diego Padres
Chris Young, 16th round, 493rd overall by the Chicago White Sox
Jonny Gomes, 18th round, 529th overall by the Tampa Bay Devil Rays
Zach Duke, 20th round, 604th overall by the Pittsburgh Pirates
Jake Mauer, 23rd round, 677th overall by the Minnesota Twins
Matt Albers, 23rd round, 686th overall by the Houston Astros
Charlie Haeger, 25th round, 763rd overall by the Chicago White Sox
Manny Parra, 26th round, 778th overall by the Milwaukee Brewers
Nick Blackburn, 29th round, 857th overall by the Minnesota Twins
Joey Gathright, 32nd round, 949th overall by the Tampa Bay Devil Rays
Chad Gaudin, 34th round, 1009th overall by the Tampa Bay Devil Rays
Rajai Davis, 38th round, 1134th overall by the Pittsburgh Pirates

NFL players drafted
Quan Cosby, 6th round, 179th overall by the Anaheim Angels
Cedric Benson, 12th round, 370th overall by the Los Angeles Dodgers
Matt Ware, 21st round, 639th overall by the Seattle Mariners
Brandon Jones, 28th round, 845th overall by the New York Yankees, but did not sign
Brooks Bollinger, 50th round, 1480th overall by the Los Angeles Dodgers, but did not sign

External links
Complete draft list from The Baseball Cube database

References

Major League Baseball draft
Draft
Major League Baseball draft
Major League Baseball draft
Baseball in New York City
Sporting events in New York City